Carey Scott (born June 21, 1965) is an American actor, writer, director and acting coach. He was born in Los Angeles, California, U.S. His popular works are Bruce Almighty (2003), God's Not Dead 2 (2016) and Mad Men (2007).

Film appearances 
 Nerd, Gimme an "F" (also known as T & A Academy 2), 1984 
 Rand, Making the Grade (also known as The Last American Preppy), C, 1984
 Kid in teller line, Prime Risk,  1985
 Male hustler, Distortions , 1987 
 Ricky's friend, The 'burbs,   1989
 Young Spock, Star Trek V: The Final Frontier,  1989
 Ryes Wallstien, Diving In,   1990
 Supervisor Charlie, Top Dog,  1995
 Barrow, Rolling Thunder, 1996 
 Bus announcer, Overkill,  1996 
 Thomas, Forest Warrior,  1996
 Tony, Ripper Man,  1996 
 Oren Ames, Bells of Innocence,  2003
 Partying Sports Guy, Bruce Almighty,  2003
 Father Lester Stillman, Birdie and Bogey,  2004

Film codirector 
 Birdie and Bogey, Norris Family Films, 2004

Television appearances

Films 
 Paul Fairgate, Not Quite Human, The Disney Channel, 1987
 Billy, The Corpse Had a Familiar Face, CBS, 1994
 Painter, As Good as Dead, USA Network, 1995
 Burton Moore, Bloodhounds, USA Network, 1996
 Bosun's mate, A Thousand Men and a Baby (also known as Narrow Escape), CBS, 1997
 Roland Hayfield, Home Invasion, NBC, 1997
 The man, The Lake, NBC, 1998
 Photographer, The Tiger Woods Story, Showtime, 1998
 Emergency room doctor, Dying to Live, UPN, 1999

Episodic 
 Billy Porter, "Not with My Date You Don't", Jennifer Slept Here, NBC, 1983
 LeonGronich, "Fallout", AfterMASH, CBS, 1983
 Steve Kremsky, "Bunker Madness", Archie Bunker's Place, CBS, 1983
 Farleigh Dickson, "The Candidate", What's Happening Now!, syndicated, 1987
 Keith Ulrich, "Best Years of Your Life", 21 Jump Street, Fox, 1988
 Keith Ulrich, "Cory and Dean Got Married", 21 Jump Street, Fox, 1988
 Keith Ulrich, "Raising Marijuana", 21 Jump Street, Fox, 1988
 Keith Ulrich, "School's Out", 21 Jump Street, Fox, 1988
 "The Diary", Mr. Belvedere, ABC, 1988
 Jack, "The Art of Death", Freddy's Nightmares, syndicated, 1989
 Kevin, "Bad Blood", Silk Stalkings, USA Network, 1992
 Motorist, "Bonnie and Claire", Renegade, USA Network and syndicated, 1993
 Fourth police officer, "Along Came a Spider", One West Waikiki, CBS, 1994
 Roland, "Family Ties", Renegade, USA Network and syndicated, 1995
 Young police officer, "For Better, for Worse", Renegade, USA Network and syndicated, 1996
 Ron Lindhart, "Slip-Up", Silk Stalkings, USA Network, 1997
 Satcom officer, "Great Expectations", Pensacola: Wings of Gold, syndicated, 1998
 Baker, "Strange Bedfellows", Silk Stalkings, USA Network, 1999
 Ramsey, "Enter the Lost Galaxy", Power Rangers Lost Galaxy, Fox, 1999
 Billy Garza, "Perfect Frank", Cover Me: Based on the True Life of an FBI Family (also known as Cover Me), USA Network, 2000
 "Tiresias", The Invisible Man, Sci-Fi Channel, 2000
 Wes Tyson, "Reel Rangers", Walker, Texas Ranger, CBS, 2001
 Frank Sarducci, "Dead Heat", Hunter, NBC, 2003
 Video technician, "The Friendly Skies", Miracles, ABC, 2003
 Tourist with camera, "Return of the Kane", Veronica Mars, UPN, 2004
 (Uncredited) Frankie, "The Prince and the Plunger", The Suite Life of Zack and Cody (also known as The Suite Life), The Disney Channel, 2005
 Appeared as Steven Richardson, "As Good as Gold", The Judge, NBC.

References

External links 

20th-century American male actors
1965 births
21st-century American male actors
American male film actors
American male television actors
Male actors from Los Angeles
Living people